Sceliphron spirifex is a species of sphecid wasp. It has a medium-sized body, which is dull black with a long, yellow petiole (waist). The legs are black with yellow bands, the antennae are black and the wings are clear.

Females build large multi-celled mud nests attached to cliffs, rocks, tree trunks, bridges and buildings. The cells are mass-provisioned with several spiders and sealed with mud.

S. spirifex lives in diverse habitats across Africa and Southern Europe, but is strongly associated with buildings and other man-made structures.

References

External links

Sphecidae
Hymenoptera of Europe
Hymenoptera of Africa
Wasps described in 1758
Taxa named by Carl Linnaeus